The Yehud attack was an attack on a civilian house in the village of Yehud carried out by a Palestinian fedayeen squad on 12 October 1953. Three Israeli Jewish civilians were killed in the attack.

The attack 

On Monday, 12 October 1953, a Palestinian Fedayeen squad infiltrated into Israel from Jordan.

A Jewish woman, Suzanne Kinyas, and her two children (a 3 year old girl and a 1 and a half year old boy) were killed.

The tracks of the perpetrators led to the Palestinian village of Rantis, then under the control of Jordan, located about five miles north of Qibya.

The attack shocked the Israeli public, both because it was the first terror attack committed in the center of Israel and because the victims of the attack were a woman and her infant children, who were killed in their sleep.

Israeli retaliation 

Although the Commander of the Arab Legion (as the Jordanian Armed Forces were known at the time), Glubb Pasha, promised that Jordan would catch the perpetrators and bring them to justice, on the morning of 13 October a decision was made by the Israeli Prime Minister David Ben-Gurion, and the Chief of Staff Mordechai Maklef, deputy chief of staff Moshe Dayan and acting defense minister Pinhas Lavon, of retaliation in response to the Yehud attack.
About 130 IDF soldiers participated in the reprisal codenamed Operation Shoshana (after the three-year-old girl killed in the Yehud attack), which was commanded by Ariel Sharon. The IDF force arrived at the village of Qibya, threw grenades and fired through the windows and doors of the houses. Then blew up 45 houses, a school, and a mosque. About 60 civilians, mostly women and children, were killed.

The act was condemned by the U.S. State Department, the UN Security Council, and by Jewish communities worldwide.

References

External links
 Jordan lets Israelis track killer of 3 - Published on The New York Times on 14 October 1953

Terrorist attacks against Israeli civilians before 1967
Terrorist attacks attributed to Palestinian militant groups
Murdered Israeli children
1953 in Israel
Terrorist incidents in Asia in 1953
1953 murders in Israel
Terrorist incidents in Israel in the 1950s
Palestinian Fedayeen insurgency